is a former Japanese football player.

Playing career
Hashimoto was born in Kanagawa Prefecture on April 16, 1975. After graduating from high school, he joined the Kashima Antlers in 1994. He played many matches as forward during the first season. However he did not play in 1996 and he moved to the Yokohama Marinos in 1997. He did not play much while there, and he retired at the end of the 1997 season.

Club statistics

References

External links

awx.jp

1975 births
Living people
Association football people from Kanagawa Prefecture
Japanese footballers
J1 League players
Kashima Antlers players
Yokohama F. Marinos players
Association football forwards